Krapf Group is a bus operator serving the Mid-Atlantic states in the United States. The business is multifaceted to include school buses, public transportation, and charter bus services. Krapf School Bus operates school bus service in Pennsylvania, Delaware, Virginia, New Jersey, and New York. Krapf Transportation operates public transportation and charter bus services. Krapf Transit currently operates public transportation routes in the Delaware Valley region for SEPTA, TMACC, and Philadelphia PHLASH. Krapf Coaches operates charter motorcoaches from the Mid-Atlantic states to points throughout the continental United States and Canada, along with providing charter bus services for colleges and universities. In 2016, Krapf purchased two 2016 MCIJ 4500 buses. In 2017, Krapf purchased Birnie Bus Service, which operated similar services in New York state.

History 
Krapf Bus Company was founded in 1942 by George H. Krapf, who purchased two buses to transport students in Downingtown and Honey Brook.

Bus service
Currently, Krapf Transit operates the following routes:
 SEPTA 
Route 204
CCT Connect paratransit service in Chester County
 TMACC 
Coatesville Link - between Coatesville and Parkesburg.
SCCOOT - between Oxford and West Chester.
The Outfitter - between Coatesville and the Urban Outfitters distribution center in Gap
 Navy Yard Express - between Center City, Philadelphia and the Naval Yard.
 Rover Community Transportation - an on demand bus service for senior citizens.  In 2012, the service provided 30,400 rides for 157 registered riders  The service is only available to seniors 65 years of age or older.  The buses operate under the "Aging Shared Rider Program" in Chester County.
 Casino Line - services to Atlantic City, New Jersey
 Philly PHLASH Downtown Loop

Krapf Coaches operates Amtrak Thruway bus service between 30th Street Station in Philadelphia and the BARTA Transportation Center in Reading, with an intermediate stop in Pottstown.

Former service: 
 Krapf Route "A" (formerly SEPTA Route 120) - linked Coatesville with West Chester and Exton. On August 1, 2021, the route was replaced with SEPTA Route 135.
TMACC Evening Link - Evening service between Parkesburg and Exton.

Currently, Birnie Bus Service operates the following routes:

 Lewis County Public Transportation
 Madison Transit System
 Oneida County Rural Transit System
 Otsego Express 
 Central New York line runs

Gallery

References

External links

Krapf official website
Birnie official website

Bus transportation in Pennsylvania
Transportation in Chester County, Pennsylvania
Paratransit services in the United States
School bus operators
Transport companies established in 1942
1942 establishments in Pennsylvania